Alauddin Ahammad (1947/1948 – 13 December 2022) was a Bangladesh Awami League politician and a Jatiya Sangsad member representing the Kishoreganj-1 constituency. He was a former Vice-chancellor of Jahangirnagar University.

Career
Ahammad was a veteran of Bangladesh Liberation war.

In 1998, Ahammad resigned after a rape on campus led to mass protests by the students and teachers.

Ahammad was elected to the parliament from Kishoreganj-1 as a Bangladesh Awami League candidate in 1999 by-election and 2001.

Ahammad had served as the education and political affairs advisor to Prime Minister Sheikh Hasina in 2013.

References

1940s births
Year of birth missing
2022 deaths
Awami League politicians
7th Jatiya Sangsad members
8th Jatiya Sangsad members
Vice-Chancellors of Jahangirnagar University
Place of birth missing
Bangladesh Krishak Sramik Awami League central committee members
People from Kishoreganj District